Jan Carlos Vargas Campos (born 27 September 1993) is a Panamanian footballer who plays primarily centre back for Barakaldo CF, on loan from Tauro. He plays his club football for Deportivo Táchira and made his national team debut in 2016. He was named to the Panama squad for the 2017 Gold Cup and started the opener against the United States.

References

External links
 

1995 births
Living people
People from David District
Panamanian footballers
Association football defenders
Liga Panameña de Fútbol players
Tauro F.C. players
Venezuelan Primera División players
Deportivo Táchira F.C. players
Segunda División B players
Barakaldo CF footballers
Panamanian expatriate sportspeople in Venezuela
Panamanian expatriate sportspeople in Spain
Expatriate footballers in Venezuela
Expatriate footballers in Spain
Panama international footballers
2017 CONCACAF Gold Cup players